Frank Custer Musser was an American politician. He served as the 27th mayor of Lancaster, Pennsylvania from 1922 to 1930.  He ran for Congress in Pennsylvania but was unsuccessful.

References

Mayors of Lancaster, Pennsylvania